Marcus Aemilius Barbula was a Roman politician from the gens Aemilia. He was a consul in 230 BC alongside Marcus Junius Pera, succeeding Marcus Pomponius Matho and Gaius Papirius Maso and preceding Lucius Postumius Albinus (consul 234 BC) and Gnaeus Fulvius Centumalus. He was son of Lucius Aemilius Barbula and grandson of Quintus Aemilius Barbula, also consuls, and the third and last of the lineage in this charge.

See also
 Aemilia (gens)

References

3rd-century BC Roman consuls
Barbula, Marcus